John Brassard  (born May 11, 1964) is a Canadian politician, who was elected to represent the riding of Barrie—Innisfil in the House of Commons of Canada in the 2015 Canadian federal election. Brassard is a former firefighter.

Political career

Barrie City Council (to 2015)
Brassard is a former city councillor for the Barrie City Council.

Federal Member of Parliament (2015-present)
Brassard was re-elected to represent the same riding at the 43rd Canadian Parliament as well as the 44th Canadian Parliament.

Brassard occupied the position Deputy Whip of the Official Opposition in the 42nd and 43rd Commons, in addition to various Committee roles.

On February 5, 2022 he was appointed Opposition House Leader by new interim Leader of the Conservative Party Candice Bergen.

Electoral record

References

External links

1964 births
Living people
Conservative Party of Canada MPs
Members of the House of Commons of Canada from Ontario
Canadian firefighters
Barrie city councillors
Politicians from Montreal
Canadian radio personalities
21st-century Canadian politicians